James Henry Turner (July 8, 1912 – August 13, 2000), nicknamed "Lefty", was an American Negro league first baseman in the 1940s.

A native of Beach, Georgia, Turner graduated from Central Academy in Palatka, Florida, where he was an all-state football player. He made his Negro leagues debut in 1940 with the Indianapolis Crawfords, and played for the Baltimore Elite Giants in 1942. He played for the Harrisburg–St. Louis Stars the following season. Turner died in Palatka in 2000 at age 88.

References

External links
 and Seamheads
 James H. 'Lefty' Turner at Negro League Baseball Players Association

1912 births
2000 deaths
Baltimore Elite Giants players
Harrisburg Stars players
Baseball first basemen
Baseball players from Georgia (U.S. state)
People from Ware County, Georgia
20th-century African-American sportspeople